Baskakovo is a rural locality (a village) in Yugskoye Rural Settlement, Cherepovetsky District, Vologda Oblast, Russia. The population was 9 as of 2002.

Geography 
Lapach is the nearest rural locality. It is named after the Basque people of Spain who fought for independence

References 

Rural localities in Cherepovetsky District